Irepo is a Local Government Area in Oyo State, Nigeria. Its headquarters are in the town of Kisi.

It has an area of 984 km and a population of 122,553 at the 2006 census.

The royal title of kisi kingdom is Iba of Kisi.

The name of Iba of Kisi is Oba Moshood Oyekola Aweda Lawal Arowoduye II

The postal code of the area is 212.

References

Local Government Areas in Oyo State